The Delta Cross Channel is a facility in California's Sacramento-San Joaquin Delta that diverts water from the Sacramento River. The facility was built in 1951 in Walnut Grove, California. 

It diverts water to Snodgrass Slough, from where it flows to the Mokelumne River, then to the San Joaquin River, towards the C.W. Bill Jones Pumping Plant, which is the intake for the Delta-Mendota Canal, part of the Central Valley Project.

Operation 
The facility was built to augment the flow of the Sacramento River through the Delta to the Jones Pumping Plant. It ensures an adequate supply of water for the Jones Pumping Plant and irrigation supplies for the Sacramento-San Joaquin Delta while controlling ocean salinity.

The gates also close during the winter to protect the fisheries in the Delta, specifically the salmon fishery. The winter closure of the facility was requested by a consortium of wildlife protection agencies, including the U.S. Fish and Wildlife Service, the National Oceanic and Atmospheric Administration, and the California Department of Fish and Wildlife. The gates are generally open during the summer months.

References

Agriculture in California
Aqueducts in California
Irrigation in the United States
San Joaquin Valley
Sacramento River
Transportation buildings and structures in Sacramento County, California
Sacramento–San Joaquin River Delta
United States Bureau of Reclamation
Central Valley Project